Karl Geis (1933 – April 7, 2014) was an American judo, aikido, and jodo instructor.  He died of prostate cancer. Karl Geis is a member of the Black Belt Magazine Hall of Fame, and the founder of Fugakukai International Association.

Martial arts
Geis was first exposed to Judo in 1955 while as a member of the US Air Force.  Karl Geis would train at the Kodokan. Geis would be promoted to 4th dan in judo at the Kodokan in 1967 at the age of 34 and to 6th dan in aikido by Kenji Tomiki in 1979. Karl Geis would win the Black Belt Magazine Judo Competitor of the Year for 1974  Geis was a founding member of the USJF Texas Yudanshakai.  Geis along with George Harris, Robey Reed, Philip S. Porter, and a few others were the founders of the United States Judo Association.  which promoted him to 10th dan on March 12, 2014. Karl was a leading light in Judo for 20 year prior to 1974. One of Karl Geis' more prominent students was two time Olympian Jimmy Wooley

Psychology
Geis worked as a psychologist and a developer as the positive reinforcement method of training in martial arts. He would be the subject of multiple independent articles including one concerning his use of psychology in Judo in black belt magazine.

Fugakukai International Association
Geis founded Fugakukai Aikido and was eventually promoted to 10th dan by the board of instructors of Fugakukai.   Geis lists as primary influences, his Japanese aikido, judo, and jodo instructors; Kenji Tomiki, Tsunako Miyake, Yoshimi Osawa, Sumiyuki Kotani, Toshiro Daigo, Kazuo Kudo, and Tatsukuma Ushijima.

Media
Geis is the author of "The Book of  Twelve Winds."

References 

American male judoka
American aikidoka
Martial arts school founders
United States Air Force airmen
Deaths from prostate cancer
20th-century American people